Yassine Kechta (born 25 February 2002) is a professional football player who plays for Le Havre. Born in France, he represents Morocco internationally.

Club career 
Yassine Kechta started his career in the Parisian region being part of the youth teams from Racing Club and Paris FC before arriving at Le Havre.

There, he came through the ranks of Le Havre AC academy, notably reaching the last 16 of the Coupe Gambardella in 2019, as he was only 15 years old.

He made his professional debut for Le Havre on the 15 May 2021, replacing Arouna Sangante in the Ligue 2 home 3–2 win against the league champions of  ESTAC Troyes.

International career 
Yassine Kechta is a youth international for Morocco. He took part in the 2018 UNAF U-17 Tournament with Morocco youth team, who reached the final at home. He later was a member of the Moroccan squad who went to the 2019 Africa U-17 Cup of Nations in Tanzania.

In 2021, when youth international football resumed after the pandemic interruption, he was part of the Moroccan squad that reached the quarter finals of the 2021 Africa U-20 Cup of Nations.

References

External links

2002 births
Living people
Footballers from Paris
Moroccan footballers
Morocco youth international footballers
French footballers
French sportspeople of Moroccan descent
Association football midfielders
Le Havre AC players
Ligue 2 players
Championnat National 2 players
Championnat National 3 players